Gabriel G. "Gabe" Ruediger (born August 29, 1977) is a former American mixed martial artist, who competed in the Lightweight division for the UFC, WEC and Tachi Palace Fights. He is a former WEC Lightweight Champion, and former TPF Lightweight Champion.

Mixed martial arts career
Ruediger is a retired mixed martial arts fighter from Rancho Cucamonga. He started training in karate when he was seven years old and eventually moved on to kung fu. He was a student at Nevada Union High School.  He appeared in a video as Paris Hilton's personal trainer.

Ruediger is a former WEC Lightweight Champion. In the WEC, he maintained a 9 fight winning streak before being defeated by Hermes Franca.
Ruediger made his UFC debut at UFC 63, losing to The Ultimate Fighter 2 contestant Melvin Guillard via body punch in the second round.

The Ultimate Fighter
Ruediger was one of three fighters on The Ultimate Fighter 5 who had previously fought inside the UFC's Octagon (the others being Joe Lauzon and Matt Wiman). Only Lauzon, of the three, had a victory in the UFC. In episode 5, Team Pulver selected Corey Hill to fight Ruediger. The episode showed Ruediger eating ice cream cake after learning of his upcoming fight, shortly before the weigh ins. He was then struggling to make the weight requirement, and let himself be dragged to and from the sauna room, but getting out before it could actually work. Ultimately, Penn and Maynard gave up and walked off as Ruediger literally begged for them to pick him back up. After displaying what could be signs of extreme exhaustion, an ambulance carried him off to the hospital. He took direct criticism from his own coaches and teammates for "taking short cuts" and displaying a lack of dedication, due to his request for a colonic to lose weight (a procedure where they input plastic tubes up your rectum to flush fecal matter out of your system) and his overall poor work ethic. The next day, Dana White dismissed Ruediger from the competition and he was ordered to leave the house.

Ruediger later stated that he saw The Ultimate Fighter show as a "marketing tool" and that audience members should "take what you see on TV with a grain of salt."

Post UFC
In a March 2007 interview Ruediger says that he would be fighting "very soon" in a "large organization". In an article by Loretta Hunt at The Fight Network, it was revealed that FEG officials had a verbal commitment from Ruediger to fight Katsuhiko Nagata for their June 2 K-1 Dynamite!! USA supercard in Los Angeles. Many unsubstantiated rumours appeared on the Internet regarding his failure to obtain a license to fight in California, asserting that his failure to make weight on The Ultimate Fighter was the reason. These were refuted in an interview with Armando Garcia, the executive director of the California State Athletic Commission (CSAC).  According to Garcia, because Ruediger was a late replacement on the K-1 Dynamite card doctors with the CSAC did not have sufficient time to review his medical information, and could not issue him a license in time for the K-1 fight. He was then cleared for a license, fighting 5 times in the state of California since his reinstatement .

Return to the UFC
After Terry Etim injured himself in preparation for his bout against Joe Lauzon at UFC 118, Ruediger signed a four fight deal with the UFC, and stepped in as Etim's replacement. The fight was selected to be shown on the Spike TV broadcast. Ruediger lost the fight early in the first round via armbar submission.

Ruediger was expected to face Paul Kelly on November 20, 2010 at UFC 123.  However, Ruediger was forced out of the bout with a groin injury.

Ruediger faced Paul Taylor on February 5, 2011 at UFC 126.  Ruediger was defeated via second round KO and subsequently released from the promotion.

Post UFC
Ruediger faced Scott "KO" Catlin on March 16, 2012 at BAMMA BadBeat 5 and lost via TKO from punches 36 seconds into the second round.

Gabe fought SiriusXM radio host Jason Ellis in a celebrity boxing match at Ellismania 8 "Shave my Friends Tonight" in Las Vegas on July 14, 2012. Gabe was KO'd by Ellis in the 2nd round. Ruediger contested that Ellis had cheated by using different wraps, gloves, and headgear and stated that if they wore the same gear, Ellis would not have won the fight. Gabe then requested a rematch with Ellis and the two fought at Ellismania 9.  Gabe lost the decision 29-28, and was generally dominated by Ellis.

Championships and accomplishments
Tachi Palace Fights
TPF Lightweight Championship (One time)
World Extreme Cagefighting
WEC Lightweight Championship (One time)

Mixed martial arts record

|-
| Win
| align=center| 18–8
| Scott Catlin
| Submission (armbar)
| Bamma USA: Bad Beat 9
| 
| align=center| 2
| align=center| 2:13
| Commerce, California, United States
| 
|-
| Loss
| align=center| 17–8
| Scott Catlin
| TKO (punches)
| Bamma USA: Bad Beat 5
| 
| align=center| 2
| align=center| 0:36
| Anaheim, California, United States
| 
|-
| Loss
| align=center| 17–7
| Paul Taylor
| KO (head kick and punches)
| UFC 126
| 
| align=center| 2
| align=center| 1:42
| Las Vegas, Nevada, United States
| 
|-
| Loss
| align=center| 17–6
| Joe Lauzon
| Submission (armbar)
| UFC 118
| 
| align=center| 1
| align=center| 2:01
| Boston, Massachusetts, United States
| 
|-
| Win
| align=center| 17–5
| Lenny Lovato
| TKO (punches)
| TPF 5: Stars and Strikes
| 
| align=center| 1
| align=center| 3:25
| Lemoore, California, United States
| 
|-
| Win
| align=center| 16–5
| Dominique Robinson
| Submission (rear-naked choke)
| TPF 3: Champions Collide
| 
| align=center| 2
| align=center| 4:49
| Lemoore, California, United States
| 
|-
| Win
| align=center| 15–5
| Wander Braga
| Submission (guillotine choke)
| Call to Arms: Called Out Fights
| 
| align=center| 2
| align=center| 0:58
| Ontario, California, United States
| 
|-
| Win
| align=center| 14–5
| Adam Lehman
| Submission (rear-naked choke)
| Fight Circuit MMA: Victorious
| 
| align=center| 1
| align=center| 2:19
| Adelanto, California, United States
| 
|-
| Win
| align=center| 13–5
| Darren Crisp
| Submission (guillotine choke)
| PFC 13: Validation
| 
| align=center| 1
| align=center| 1:03
| Lemoore, California, United States
| 
|-
| Win
| align=center| 12–5
| Max Son
| Submission (rear-naked choke)
| Gladiator Challenge: Warriors
| 
| align=center| 1
| align=center| 0:24
| Pauma Valley, California, United States
| 
|-
| Loss
| align=center| 11–5
| Justin Wilcox
| Decision (unanimous)
| JG and TKT Promotions: Fighting 4 Kidz
| 
| align=center| 3
| align=center| 5:00
| Santa Monica, California, United States
| 
|-
| Loss
| align=center| 11–4
| Akbarh Arreola
| Submission (kimura)
| MMA Xtreme 15
| 
| align=center| 1
| align=center| 2:03
| Mexico City, Mexico
| 
|-
| Win
| align=center| 11–3
| George Kassimatis
| Submission (guillotine choke)
| Ringside Ticket
| 
| align=center| 1
| align=center| 3:51
| Highland, California, United States
| 
|-
| Loss
| align=center| 10–3
| Melvin Guillard
| TKO (punch to the body)
| UFC 63: Hughes vs. Penn
| 
| align=center| 2
| align=center| 1:01
| Anaheim, California, United States
| 
|-
| Win
| align=center| 10–2
| Savant Young
| Submission (armbar)
| PF 1: The Beginning
| 
| align=center| 3
| align=center| 1:29
| Hollywood, California, United States
| 
|-
| Loss
| align=center| 9–2
| Hermes França
| KO (punches)
|  WEC 19: Undisputed
| 
| align=center| 1
| align=center| 0:36
| Lemoore, California, United States
| 
|-
| Win
| align=center| 9–1
| Sam Wells
| Decision (unanimous)
|  WEC 17: Halloween Fury 4
| 
| align=center| 3
| align=center| 5:00
| Lemoore, California, United States
| 
|-
| Win
| align=center| 8–1
| Bobir Hasanov
| Submission (armbar)
| KOTC 61: Flash Point
| 
| align=center| 1
| align=center| 0:23
| San Jacinto, California, United States
| 
|-
| Win
| align=center| 7–1
| Jason Maxwell
| Submission (rear-naked choke)
|  WEC 14: Vengeance
| 
| align=center| 1
| align=center| 3:28
| Lemoore, California, United States
| 
|-
| Win
| align=center| 6–1
| Olaf Alfonso
| Submission (rear-naked choke)
| WEC 12
| 
| align=center| 1
| align=center| 3:05
| Lemoore, California, United States
| 
|-
| Win
| align=center| 5–1
| Steve Ramerez
| Submission (triangle choke)
| WEC 11
| 
| align=center| 1
| align=center| 1:24
| Lemoore, California, United States
| 
|-
| Win
| align=center| 4–1
| Cory Reeves
| TKO (punches)
| IFC: Battleground Tahoe
| 
| align=center| 1
| align=center| 2:40
| Lake Tahoe, Nevada, United States
| 
|-
| Win
| align=center| 3–1
| Carlos Cordero
| TKO (punches)
| WEC 7
| 
| align=center| 1
| align=center| 2:57
| Lemoore, California, United States
| 
|-
| Win
| align=center| 2–1
| Phat Houng
| Submission (rear-naked choke)
| Pit Fighting Championship
| 
| align=center| 1
| align=center| 1:10
| N/A
| 
|-
| Win
| align=center| 1–1
| Josh Gardner
| TKO (punches)
| Gladiator Challenge 14
| 
| align=center| 1
| align=center| 1:41
| Porterville, California, United States
| 
|-
| Loss
| align=center| 0–1
| Sam Wells
| KO (punch)
| WEC 5: Halloween Havoc
| 
| align=center| 1
| align=center| 4:27
| Lemoore, California, United States
|

References

External links
 Gabe's personal site
 The Ultimate Fighter 5 Bio
 Post-TUF 5 Interview
 
 
 NOKAUT Profile

American male mixed martial artists
Mixed martial artists utilizing wushu
Mixed martial artists utilizing judo
Mixed martial artists utilizing Brazilian jiu-jitsu
American wushu practitioners
American male judoka
American practitioners of Brazilian jiu-jitsu
People awarded a black belt in Brazilian jiu-jitsu
World Extreme Cagefighting champions
1977 births
Living people
People from Topanga, California
People from Rancho Cucamonga, California
People from Van Nuys, Los Angeles
Ultimate Fighting Championship male fighters